Spencerport Methodist Church, also known as Spencerport United Methodist Church, is a historic Methodist church located at Spencerport in Monroe County, New York, United States.  It is a Romanesque style, three- by seven-bay church building constructed of brick on a foundation of Medina sandstone.  Initially constructed in 1870–1871, the interior was updated in 1909 to the Akron Plan precepts for church design.

It was listed on the National Register of Historic Places in 2008.

References

Churches on the National Register of Historic Places in New York (state)
Methodist churches in New York (state)
Romanesque Revival architecture in New York (state)
Churches completed in 1871
19th-century Methodist church buildings in the United States
Churches in Monroe County, New York
Akron Plan church buildings
National Register of Historic Places in Monroe County, New York